The Prime–Octagon House, built in 1859, is a historic octagonal house located at 41 Prime Avenue in Huntington, Suffolk County, New York. The house is next door to the 1855-built Prime House, and across the street from the Heckscher Museum of Art.

On September 26, 1985, it was added to the National Register of Historic Places.

References

Houses on the National Register of Historic Places in New York (state)
Houses completed in 1859
Octagon houses in New York (state)
Houses in Suffolk County, New York
National Register of Historic Places in Huntington (town), New York